The list of Yes concert tours is divided into four articles chronologically:
 List of Yes concert tours (1960s–70s)
 List of Yes concert tours (1980s–90s)
 List of Yes concert tours (2000s–10s)
 List of Yes concert tours (2020s)